Top-seeded pair Kathy Horvath and Virginia Ruzici claimed the title by defeating Gigi Fernández and Beth Herr in the final.

Seeds
A champion seed is indicated in bold text while text in italics indicates the round in which that seed was eliminated.

Draw

Finals

Top half

Bottom half

External links

U.S. Clay Court Championships
1983 U.S. Clay Court Championships